Lepidosaphes newsteadi is a scale insect species in the family Diaspididae that was first described in 1895.

Range
Lepidosaphes newsteadi is widespread in central and western Europe, Lebanon, and Turkey.  

It was introduced accidentally into North America and Bermuda.

Bermuda cedar
After being introduced to Bermuda during World War II, it nearly caused the extinction of the native Bermuda cedar.

References 

Lepidosaphidini